In medical terms, an insult is the cause of some kind of physical or mental injury.  For example, a burn on the skin (the injury) may be the result of a thermal, chemical, radioactive, or electrical event (the insult).  Likewise sepsis and trauma are examples of foreign insults, and encephalitis, multiple sclerosis, and brain tumors are examples of insults to the brain.  Insults may also be categorized as either genetic or environmental.

References

Medical terminology